"Gone" is a song by American recording artist Kelly Clarkson, from her second studio album, Breakaway (2004). Written by Kara DioGuardi and co-written and produced by John Shanks, "Gone" is a pop song about a woman leaving her lover in search for a better relationship. "Gone" was well received by music critics, though it garnered comparisons with similarly-titled "Since U Been Gone". Two years after Breakaways release, "Gone" charted in the Billboard Pop 100 chart at number 77. Clarkson has also performed the song in concert tours, primarily during the Breakaway World Tour from 2005–06 and the Stronger Tour in 2012.

Background and composition 
"Gone" was written by Kara DioGuardi and John Shanks, with Shanks also serving as the song's producer. It was one of the two collaborations by DioGuardi and Shanks for Kelly Clarkson's second studio album, Breakaway, along with "You Found Me". Written by in the key of D minor, "Gone" is a pop rock song with a length of 3 minutes and 25 seconds. Clarkson describes it as "feisty".

Cover versions 
Mexican pop band RBD released a Spanish cover of the song titled "Me Voy" for their second studio album, Nuestro Amor (2005). They would later re-record the original version in English on the Japanese edition of their first English-language album Rebels (2006).

Critical response 
"Gone" received generally positive reviews from critics, who compared the song to  "Since U Been Gone", which is also a track from Breakaway. Charles Merwin of Stylus Magazine wrote that "Gone" "sounds like as though it’s grafted the most tame version of Akufen, Christina Aguilera, and latin guitar on top of one another into a hugely satisfying pop masterpiece". The music site, Popservations.com, included it as one of "Clarkson’s Best Non-Singles", they wrote that the song "has all the makings of another Clarkson smash, a solid pop-rock production (the stop-start guitar, the filtered drum loop as the chorus kicks in) in which she pointedly tells some loser ex that she’s now Miss Independent."

Credits and personnel 
Credits adapted from the Breakaway liner notes.

Recording
Recorded at Henson Recording Studios, Hollywood, California

Personnel

 Lead Vocals – Kelly Clarkson
 Production, Guitar, Keyboards – John Shanks
 Drums – Jeff Rothschild
 Bass – John Shanks, Paul Bushnell
 Mixing, Recording – John Shanks, Jeff Rothschild
 Pro-Tools engineering – John Hanes

 Assistance – Glenn Pittman
 Additional Engineering – Mark Valentine, Lars Fox
 Recording – Ryan Tedder, Craig Durrance
 Production coordination – Shari Sutclihe
 Songwriting – Kara DioGuardi, John Shanks

Charts

References 

2004 songs
Kelly Clarkson songs
Songs written by Kara DioGuardi
Songs written by John Shanks
Song recordings produced by John Shanks